Methylobacter tundripaludum is a methane-oxidizing bacterium. It is Gram-negative, rod-shaped, non-motile, non-spore forming, with type strain SV96T (=DSM 17260T =ATCC BAA-1195T). Its genome has been sequenced.

References

Further reading

External links

 LPSN
Type strain of Methylobacter tundripaludum at BacDive -  the Bacterial Diversity Metadatabase

Gammaproteobacteria
Bacteria described in 2006